Larry Hart (born July 16, 1987) is a former American football player. He was selected in the 2010 NFL Draft by the Jacksonville Jaguars. Larry was born in Madison, Mississippi. He played defensive end and outside linebacker for Central Arkansas. He also played at Holmes Community College.

Professional career
He was drafted by the Jacksonville Jaguars with the 143rd overall pick in the fifth round of the 2010 NFL Draft.

Hart was released from the Jaguars on September 3, 2011.

References

External links
 Player biography at CBS Sports

1987 births
Living people
American football defensive ends
American football outside linebackers
Central Arkansas Bears football players
Jacksonville Jaguars players
People from Madison, Mississippi
Players of American football from Mississippi